Mexcala synagelese is a jumping spider species in the genus Mexcala that lives in Angola, Democratic Republic of Congo, Ivory Coast, Nigeria and Sudan. It was first described by Wanda Wesołowska in 2009.

References

Salticidae
Fauna of Angola
Fauna of the Democratic Republic of the Congo
Fauna of Ivory Coast
Fauna of Nigeria
Fauna of Sudan
Spiders of Africa
Spiders described in 2009
Taxa named by Wanda Wesołowska